Arthur Ashley (October 6, 1886 – December 28, 1970) was an actor, writer, and director of silent films and also acted in legitimate theater. He was involved with World Pictures. He directed and acted in several film productions. Later in his career he established his own stock company for theatrical productions.

His starring roles included The Guardian.

He worked with William A. Brady's daughter Alice Brady on several projects.

He was also the manager of the Percy Williams Actors' Home.

Filmography

Actor

Director
 The Guardian (1917)
 The Marriage Market (1917)
 Rasputin, the Black Monk (1917)
 Shall We Forgive Her? (1917)
 The Beautiful Mrs. Reynolds (1918)
 Broken Ties (1918) 
 Oh Mary Be Careful (1921)

References

External links
 

1886 births
1970 deaths
Place of birth missing
Place of death missing
Silent film directors
American male silent film actors
20th-century American male actors
American film directors
20th-century American screenwriters